Season's Greetings is a cover album by Tatsurō Yamashita, released in November 1993. It is sort of a holiday album, though some of the songs have nothing to do with christmas or the winter season.

Season's Greetings features an English version of his signature song "Christmas Eve". The remake version, that has lyrics written by Alan O'Day, was included on several reissues of the CD single of the song in later years.

Track listing
"Acappella Variation on a Theme by Gluck" (Christoph Willibald Gluck) - 0:49
"Bella Notte" (Peggy Lee, Sonny Burke) - 3:50
"Be My Love" (Nicholas Brodzsky, Sammy Cahn) - 3:40
"Angels We Have Heard on High" (traditional) - 1:00
"Smoke Gets in Your Eyes" (Otto Harbach, Jerome Kern) - 3:08
"Silent Night" (Franz Gruber, Josef Mohr) - 1:09
"My Gift to You" (James Harris III, Terry Lewis) - 4:05
"It's All in the Game" (Carl Sigman, Charles G. Dawes) - 3:23
"Just a Lonely Christmas" (Harvey Fuqua, Alan Freed) - 2:24
"Happy Holiday" (Bob Staunton) - 2:20
"Blue Christmas" (Billy Hayes, Jay W. Johnson) - 2:46
"White Christmas" (Irving Berlin) -　2:23
"Christmas Eve" [English Version] (Tatsuro Yamashita, Alan O'Day) - 4:13
"Have Yourself a Merry Little Christmas" (Hugh Martin, Ralph Blane) - 2:48
"O Come All Ye Faithful" (John Francis Wade) - 0:53
Bonus tracks (2013 Remaster)
"White Christmas" (Happy Xmas Show! version) (Berlin) - 2:26
"We Wish You a Merry Christmas" (traditional)　- 0:47
"Jingle Bell Rock" (Live version) (Joe Beal, Jim Boothe) - 2:24
"O Little One Sweet" - 0:49
"Jingle Bell Rock" (Happy Xmas Show! version) (Beal, Boothe) - 2:21
"It's All in the Game" (Live version) (Sigman, Dawes)- 5:36
"Joy to the World" - 0:37

Charts

Weekly charts

Year-end charts

Certifications

References

Tatsuro Yamashita albums
1993 Christmas albums
Christmas albums by Japanese artists